The 1881 Wellington City mayoral election was part of the New Zealand local elections held that same year to decide who would take the office of Mayor of Wellington.

Background
Incumbent mayor William Hutchison sought re-election for another term but lost the election in a three-way race to George Fisher.

Election results
The following table gives the election results:

Notes

References

Mayoral elections in Wellington
1881 elections in New Zealand
Politics of the Wellington Region
1880s in Wellington
November 1881 events